Armaan Kohli (born 23 March 1972) is an Indian actor. He is the son of film director Rajkumar Kohli and actress Nishi.He is most known for his role in Jaani Dushman.

Early life and education
Kohli was born to film director Rajkumar Kohli and actress Nishi. He studied at Our Lady of Perpetual Succour High School in Chembur until he dropped out in Class IX. Kohli appeared as a child artist in two films directed by his father: Badle Ki Aag (1982) and Raaj Tilak (1984).

Career
Armaan made his debut as a leading actor in his father's 1992 film Virodhi. He was set to star in Deewana opposite the late actress Divya Bharti, but walked out of the film after completing the first shooting schedule and later Shah Rukh Khan was penciled in as his replacement, and Deewana became a blockbuster. Kohli was also considered for the lead role for Baazigar, but that role too eventually went to Shah Rukh Khan. Similarly, he opted out of Dilwale Dulhania Le Jayenge and his role was eventually played by Parmeet Sethi.

Kohli starred in several other films in the 1990s including Dushman Zamana (1992), Anaam (1993) and Aulad Ke Dushman which failed at the box office. His father tried to revive his career with the 1997 film Qahar (1997) where he co-starred with Sunny Deol and Sunil Shetty, which was a commercial failure. 

After a five-year hiatus, he returned with the multi-starrer Jaani Dushman: Ek Anokhi Kahani which also failed to do well. In this film he was reintroduced with a new name 'Munish Kohli', and carried on with this name in subsequent films.

In September 2013, he joined the reality television series Bigg Boss 7 as a contestant. On 16 December 2013, Kohli was arrested for alleged physical abuse with his co-participant, Sofia Hayat during the show. He was released on bail next day. 

Kohli made another comeback to Bollywood after 12 years, playing a negative role in the Rajshri Productions Salman Khan starrer Prem Ratan Dhan Payo which released on 12 November 2015.

Controversies
Armaan Kohli was arrested in June 2018 by Mumbai Police after his girlfriend Neetu Randhawa had lodged a complaint against him citing physical assault. However, she later withdrew her complaint.

Kohli was later arrested in August 2021 By Narcotic Control Bureau over the possession of 1.2 grams of cocaine. He was granted bail in September 2022 after being lodged in jail for a year.

Filmography

Television

References

External links

Living people
1972 births
Place of birth missing (living people)
Indian male film actors
Male actors in Hindi cinema
Bigg Boss (Hindi TV series) contestants